Elbenschwand is a village and a former municipality in the district of Lörrach in Baden-Württemberg, Germany. Since 1 January 2009, it is part of the municipality Kleines Wiesental. Elbenschwand is located in the Southern Black Forest Nature Park in the valley of the Little Meadow at an altitude below 1000 meters. Forests occupy 72% of the previous district's district.

In the area of the Elbenschwand district are the villages of Elbenschwand, Holl and Langensee and the small group of houses Buck. Holl and Langensee are located in the valley of the Little Meadow, while Elbenschwand is located on the mountain.

References

Villages in Baden-Württemberg
Lörrach (district)
Baden